Pedioplanis mayeri is a species of lizard in the family Lacertidae. The species is endemic to Namibia. It is named after the Austrian lacertid specialist Werner Mayer.

Pedioplanis mayeri measure  in snout–vent length.

References

Pedioplanis
Lacertid lizards of Africa
Reptiles of Namibia
Endemic fauna of Namibia
Reptiles described in 2021
Taxa named by Aaron M. Bauer